

Major bridges

See also 

 Transport in Zimbabwe
 National Railways of Zimbabwe
 Geography of Zimbabwe
 List of rivers of Zimbabwe
 List of crossings of the Zambezi River

References 
 Nicolas Janberg, Structurae.com, International Database for Civil and Structural Engineering

 Others references

External links

Further reading 
 
 

Zimbabwe

b
Bridges